Railway engineering is a multi-faceted engineering discipline dealing with the design, construction and operation of all types of rail transport systems. It encompasses a wide range of engineering disciplines, including civil engineering, computer engineering, electrical engineering, mechanical engineering, industrial engineering and production engineering. A great many other engineering sub-disciplines are also called upon.

History 
With the advent of the railways in the early nineteenth century, a need arose for a specialized group of engineers capable of dealing with the unique problems associated with railway engineering. As the railways expanded and became a major economic force, a great many engineers became involved in the field, probably the most notable in Britain being Richard Trevithick, George Stephenson and Isambard Kingdom Brunel. Today, railway systems engineering continues to be a vibrant field of engineering.

Subfields 
Mechanical engineering
 Command, control & railway signalling
Office systems design
Data center design
SCADA
Network design
 Electrical engineering
 Energy electrification
Third rail
 Fourth rail
Overhead contact system
 Civil engineering
 Permanent way engineering
 Light rail systems
 On-track plant
 Rail systems integration
 Train control systems
 Cab signalling
 Railway vehicle engineering
 Rolling resistance
 Curve resistance
 Wheel–rail interface
 Hunting oscillation
 Railway systems engineering
 Railway signalling
Fare collection
CCTV
Public address
Intrusion detection
Access control
 Systems integration

Professional organisations 
In the UK: The Railway Division of the Institution of Mechanical Engineers (IMechE).

In the US The American Railway Engineering and Maintenance-of-Way Association (AREMA)

In the Philippines Philippine Railway Engineers' Association, (PREA) Inc. 

Worldwide The Institute of Railway Signal Engineers (IRSE)

See also 

 Association of American Railroads
 Exsecant
 Degree of curvature 
List of engineering topics
List of engineers
 Minimum railway curve radius
 Radius of curvature (applications)
 Track transition curve
 Transition curve

External links
 Institution of Mechanical Engineers - Railway Division
 AAR

 Engineering disciplines
 Rail technologies
Transportation engineering